Speedy Graphito, (or Olivier Rizzo), is a French painter who is considered a pioneer of the French Street Art movement.

Speedy Graphito uses stencils and brush to create paintings, prints and street art murals.  Since 1984, his work has appeared in numerous exhibitions worldwide and he has created many performance events.

Background. 
Speedy Graphito was born in Paris in 1961.  In 1983, after a brief career as a graphic designer and art director, he joined the collective X-Moulinex. He left X-Moulinex  in 1984.

In 1985, Speedy Graphito attended the first meeting of the graffiti and urban art movement in Bondy, France. Other attendees included Jef Aerosol, Miss Tic, SP 38, Epsylon Point, Blek le Rat, Futura 2000, Nuklé-Art, Kim Prisu, and Banlieue-Banlieue

By 1989 Speedy Graphito had participated in several art exhibitions mainly in Paris.  By the late 1990s his works were being exhibited in art galleries across Europe.

Career 
Speedy Graphito uses stencils or brushes to execute his graffiti.  He incorporates schematic and dynamic characters approaching those of Javier Mariscal or  Keith Haring.  Speedy's other influences include 1950's United States, cartoons, Manga and images in Maya culture. He is also influenced by the iconography of Disney characters and video games,

One of Speedy Graphito works is  “Temptation 2011” featuring Disney’s Snow White enamored with the half-eaten logo of Apple Macintosh

Speedy Graphito lives and works in Paris.

Exhibitions 
2013
Exhibition, Maison Triolet-Aragon, Moulin de Villeneuve, Saint Arnoult-en-Yvelines
NewWorlds, Fabien Castanier Gallery, Los Angeles, CA, SOLO
2012
French Invasion, Fabien Castanier Gallery, Los Angeles, CA
2011
FreeWay, Fabien Castanier Gallery, Los Angeles, CA, SOLO
Speedy Goes to Miami, Arts for a Better World Art Fair, Miami Art Basel Week, Miami, FL, SOLO
Solo Show, Opera gallery, London, SOLO
Graffcity, Opera Gallery,  Paris
Inaugural Exhibition, Fabien Castanier Gallery, Los Angeles, CA
Urban Activity, Espace culturel Jean Cocteau, Les lilas
Fondation Clément, Mix Art, La Martinique
Atrium, Mix Art, La Martinique
News works, Lille Art Fair (ArtUp), Galerie Brugier Rigail, Lille
Back2Venus, New Square Gallery, Lille, SOLO
News works, Artop, Lille, SOLO
Exit, Galerie australe, La Réunion, SOLO
2010
What did you expect?, Galerie Brugier Rigail, Paris, SOLO
News works, Lille Art Fair,  Galerie Brugier Rigail, Lille
News works, St’art, Galerie Brugier Rigail, Strasbourg
Mondovision, Artop, Lille, SOLO
2009
Prime time,  Art Partner Galerie, Brussels, SOLO
News works, Lille Art Fair, Galerie Brugier Rigail, Lille
Stepanska Street Art, Institut français de Prague
No Man’s Land, Ambassade de France au Japon, Tokyo
News works, St’art, Galerie Brugier Rigail, Strasbourg
2008
Sans issues, Art Partner Galerie, Paris, SOLO
Voyage aux Pays des Merveilles, Centre Régional d'Art Contemporain de Fontenoy, SOLO
Group show, Art Partner Galerie, Brussels
Group show, Art Partner Galerie, Paris
St'art, Art Partner Galerie,  Strasbourg, SOLO
2007
Connexions, Art Partner Galerie, Paris, SOLO
Lille aux trésors, Artop, Lille, SOLO
St'art, Art Partner Galerie, Strasbourg, SOLO
Group show, Art Partner Galerie, Paris
Group show, Art Partner Galerie, Paris
Artenime, Art Partner Galerie, Nîmes, SOLO
Urban pop, Ambrogi – Castanier Gallery, West Hollywood, CA, SOLO
2006
Tatouages Urbains, Galerie Anne Vignial, Paris, Retro : Prospective, Galerie Suty, Coye la Forêt, SOLO
St'art, Art Partner Galerie, Strasbourg, SOLO
Sur les Murs, Centre Culturel Francais, Tlemcen (Algérie), Salon de la Lingerie, Porte de Versailles, Paris Aux arts citoyens, *Espace des Blancs Manteaux, Paris, Artistes Urbains, Galerie Anne Vignial, Paris
Trendmarks, Galerie Suty, Coye la Forêt
Avant travaux, Usines Mauchauffée, Troyes
Artenime,  Art Partner Galerie, Nîmes, SOLO
2005
Parcours de la Bièvre, Lézart de la Bièvre, Paris, SOLO
Deck’on, Exposition itinérante, Montpellier, Paris, Alpe d’huez, Bienne
Salon de la Lingerie, Porte de Versailles, Paris
Section Urbaine, Les Blancs Manteaux, Paris
Rue des Artistes, Galerie Anne Vignial, Paris
Dites 33, La Condition Publique, Roubaix
2004
L’Aventure Intérieure,  Espace Beaurepaire, Paris, SOLO
Les Mutants, Péniche Antipode, La nuit blanche, Paris
Les Muutants 2,  Péniche Antipode, Paris
Les Mots,  Foire de Lille, Galerie Kahn
Vœux d’artistes,  Galerie Kahn,  Espace Beaurepaire, Paris
L’Humanité, Fête de l’huma, Galerie les singuliers, Paris
Paf dans ton Pif, Hommage à Pif Gadget,  Paris
Art de Rue, (Mesnager, VLP, Graphito) Espace Tiffaine, Paris
Série Murmures, Mémoires et Dessins Récents,  Foire St Germain, Paris
Stencil project, Arslonga, Paris
Stencil project, Glazart, Paris
Portraits incognitos, Galerie Sanguine, Paris
Terminus, La Chapelle du Carmel, Chalon sur Saône, SOLO
2003
Wake up,  Galerie Polaris, Paris, SOLO
Le Musée Idéal,  Espace Beaurepaire, Paris
FIAC, Galerie Polaris, Paris
Ma Collection Préfère, Espace Beaurepaire, Paris
Artistes, L’atelier d’artiste Chez Vous, Paris
ART de Rue, Galerie Kahn, Strasbourg
Epoque Epique, L’Atelier d’artiste Chez Vous, Paris, SOLO
2002
Voyages en Terres Inconnues, L’Atelier d’Artiste Chez Vous, Paris
2001
General motors, Fondation Colas, Paris
1999
Artistes de la Galerie, Galerie Polaris, Paris
1998
Welcome to Vénus, Galerie Polaris, Paris
1997
Images Cathodiques, SAGA, Paris
Artistes de la Galerie,  Galerie Polaris, FIAC,  Paris
Exposition de Groupe, Galerie du chal, Saint Brieuc
Lapintures, Galerie Hugues de Payns, Tours
1996
L’être ou ne palette,  Espace Saint Jacques, Saint Quentin, SOLO
ARCO, Galerie Punto, Madrid, Spain
1995
C’est moi qui Lapin, Sétois qui voit, Galerie Beau Lézard, Sète,  SOLO
The new pier show, Arco Galerie Punto, Madrid, Spain
Artistes de la Galerie, Foire de Chicago, Galerie Punto, USA
Les sirènes, Musée de Dieppe
Artistes de la Galerie, FIAC, Galerie Punto, Paris
Art de Groupe, Espace Cargo, Marseille
Artistes de la Galerie,  Art Koln, Galerie Punto, Germany
La vie don't je suis le Héros, Galerie Polaris, Paris, SOLO
1994
Que Passa, Galerie Punto, Valencia, Spain, SOLO
Viva Lapinture, Galerie Italia, Alicante, Spain, SOLO
Artistes de la Galerie, FIAC, Galerie Polaris, Paris
Artistes de la Galerie, SAGA, Galerie Polaris, Paris
Un artiste invite un artiste,  Galerie Polaris, Paris
Les déjeunées sur l’herbe, Galerie Beau Lézard –Sête, Paris/Seoul/ Tokyo
1993
Le monde Alaloupe, Galerie Polaris, Paris, SOLO
One man show,  Galerie Polaris, FIAC, Paris, SOLO
Artistes de la galerie, SAGA, Galerie Polaris, Paris
Œuvres Monumentales, Galerie Polaris, Paris
1992
One man show, Galerie Polaris, FIAC, Paris, SOLO
Artistes de la Galerie, SAGA, Galerie Polaris, Paris
Comme convenue lors de …, Galerie Polaris, Paris
Figurations, fin de millenaire,  Exposition itinérante
5 Ans d’édition 1987-1992,  Galerie Polaris, Paris
1991
Paris, Tours, Rennes, Galerie Polaris, Galerie Michel Pommier, Galerie Collin, SOLO
Artistes de la galerie,  FIAC, Galerie Polaris, Paris
Exposition de Groupe, Galerie Metropolis, Lyon
Exposition de Groupe, Galerie Michel Pommier, Tours
Pour Saluer le Destin, Musée d’Ingres, Montauban
1990
Speedy Graphito, Produit de l’art, Espace Action, Paris, SOLO
Retour d’Afrique, Galerie Michel Pommier, Tours, SOLO
Speedy Graphito Peint l’Art moderne de 1990 à nos jours, Galerie Polaris, Paris, SOLO
Artistes de la Galerie,  SAGA, Galerie Polaris, Paris
Artistes de la Galerie, FIAC, Galerie Polaris, Paris
Exposition de Groupe, Galerie Patrick Riquelme, Vannes
1989
King of the City,  Galerie Polaris, Paris, SOLO
Artistes de la Galerie, SAGA, Galerie Polaris, Paris
Artistes de la Galerie,  FIAC,  Galerie Polaris, Paris
Le Témoignage de la Peinture 1789-1989, Centre d’Art Contemporain, Avranches
1988
Etude des Saints, Galerie Polaris, Paris, SOLO
One man show, Galerie Polaris, FIAC, Paris, SOLO
Artistes de la Galerie,  Interarte, Galerie Polaris, Valencia, Spain
Artistes de la Galerie, FIAC, Galerie Polaris, Paris
1987
Le Radeau des médusés, Espace action, Paris, SOLO
Lapinture au génie, Galerie Wanet, Charleroi, SOLO
Les allumées de la télé, Grande Halle de la Vilette, Paris
Exposition de Groupe, Art Jonction International, Nice
Artistes de la Galerie, FIAC, Galerie Polaris, Paris
1986
L’atelier de l’artiste, Galerie Polaris, Paris, SOLO
Génie Artistique, Institut Français de Naples, Italie, SOLO
Les Médias Peintres, Maison de la culture de Rennes
Le Speedy Maton, Galerie d’Art contemporain de Nice
Peintures Sauvages, Frasso Télésino, Italie
Vers de Nouvelles z’Aventures, Centre Culturel, Évry, SOLO
1985
A la recherche de Zarzan, Galerie Paradis, Paris, SOLO
Meurtre dans un Château Anglais,  Galerie Polaris, Paris, SOLO
La boutique à Speedy, Galerie Polaris, Paris
Emotions, Espace Saint Jacques, Saint Quentin
Mouchoirs d’Artistes, Galerie Lara Vinci, Paris
Détournement d’Affiches, Centre national des arts plastiques (CNAP), Paris
1984
Et Dans Dix Ans, Espace Cardin, Paris

Performances 
2011
Murs Peints, Rio-Brésil
Performances, Mix Art Madinina, Martinique
2010
Lézarts de la Bièvre, Paris
Collage »Association le MUR– Paris
2009
FIART, Performance pizza Beaubourg, Paris
Réalisation d' un court métrage « Faites de beaux rêves »
2006 
Réalisation d' un court métrage pour « Faites de beaux rêves »
Réalisation d’un film vidéo pour le DVD du groupe "Lukrate milk ".
Performance pour le mondial de l'automobile.
2005
Parcours de la Bièvre – Lézart de la Bièvre – Paris
Festival international du graffiti Kosmopolite – Bagnolet
Peinture de l’autobus du Batofar.
2004
Stencil project » – Paris
Réalisation du film "terminus "installation performance filmée.
2003
Réalisation d' une série en images de synthèse " WELCOME TO VENUS " pour CANAL+.
Création du groupe musical et vidéographique " French Legumes ".
2002
Réalisation de vidéos pour "Le Festival du Chien à plumes ".
2001
Réalisation de vidéos pour "Le Festival du Chien à plumes ".
Réalisation de vidéos de scène pour le groupe musical  " PLUTO ".
1993
Création de l' identité visuelle de " La Halle Saint-Pierre ".
Commande publique de la Direction des Affaires Culturelles de la ville de Paris.
Création de l' emblème de la mission spaciale " ALTAîR " vol habité Franco-russe (C.N.E.S.).
1992
Décoration de la péniche " EUROPE ODYSSEE " qui a rejoint Paris-Moscou par les canaux (FR3).
1991
Décoration d' un hobbit-cat pour la traversée du Détroit de Formose par Olivier Chiabodo.
Décoration de l' école polyvalente rue de la vilette (Paris) dans le cadre du 1%.
Projections pour le concert de J.M. Jarre (La Défense - Paris).
1987 
Création de " SPEEDO " Le journal des fans de Speedy.
Création d' une ligne de Tee-shirts " YOU ARE THE WORLD ".
Décor de théatre pour " La nuit s' est habillée ce soir en scaramouche " de Saskia Cohen-Tanugi (Festival Molière de Montpellier)
1986 
Création de l' affiche " LA RUEE VERS L' ART " pour le Ministère de la culture.

References

External links 
 Official Website
 Fabien Castanier Gallery
 Galerie Berthéas Les Tournesols

French graffiti artists
Living people
Year of birth missing (living people)